Sensa Anima (initiated in 1999 under the name Crownfall) was a Norwegian heavy metal band from Oslo.

Biography 
The band was founded as Crownfall at the end or the 1990s, but was renamed Sensa Anima just before they released their debut album Synthetic (2000). This was their onely release, and has since not done much to mention. In 2000 they won Spellemannprisen in the category Hard rock for the debut album Synthetic.

The band members Kildahl, Andersen, Stokland and Berglie have all played within Old Man's Child. Stokland and Berglie have also played together within Khold, and Andersen has played live with Satyricon, while "Si" used to cooperate within Jack In The Box.

Band members 
 Eric Si (Lars Erik Stang Sætheren) - vocals
 Geir Kildahl - guitar
 Terje Andersen - guitar
 Sverre Stokland - bass
 Thomas Berglie - drums

Discography 
2000: Synthetic (Face Front)

References

External links 
 MIC.no Article from Norsk pop- og rockleksikon

Norwegian rock music groups
Spellemannprisen winners
Musical groups established in 1999
1999 establishments in Norway